Ranjna Patel  is the founder of the Gandhi Nivas family violence prevention programme in New Zealand.

Work 
Patel founded the Gandhi Nivas family violence prevention programme in 2014. The programme partners with Counties Manukau Police and Sahaayta Counseling and Social Support to deliver services to New Zealand men considered at risk of committing domestic violence, to support them to change their behaviour. The "ground-breaking" programme removes men from the family home and places them in specially-run homes in order to support them to understand and change their behaviour. In nearly 60% of cases, men who have completed the programme do not go on to re-offend.

Patel is also a co-founder and director of Tamaki Health, a primary healthcare group.

Patel sits on a number of advisory boards, including New Zealand Police's National Ethnic Forum, the Mental Health Foundation and Diversity Works, New Zealand's national body for workplace diversity and inclusion.

Honours and awards 
In the 2009 New Year Honours, Patel was awarded the Queen's Service Medal, for services to the Indian community. In the 2017 New Year Honours, she was appointed an Officer of the New Zealand Order of Merit, for services to health and the Indian community. Also in 2017, Patel was the NEXT Woman of the Year in the Business & Innovation category.

In 2020, Patel received a Community Hero award at the New Zealand Women of Influence Awards, for her work reducing family violence. In 2021, she was awarded Innovator of the Year in the New Zealander of the Year Awards.

References

External links 
The website for the Gandhi Nivas programme

Living people
Year of birth missing (living people)
Officers of the New Zealand Order of Merit
Recipients of the Queen's Service Medal
New Zealand Women of Influence Award recipients
New Zealand justices of the peace